Tekheyt-e Sofla (also Romanized as Tekheyt-e Soflá; also known as Tekheyţ-e Pā’īn and Tokīt) is a village in Jarahi Rural District, in the Central District of Mahshahr County, Khuzestan Province, Iran. At the 2006 census, its population was 78, in 16 families.

References 

Populated places in Mahshahr County